Adam Michael Richard Sopp (born 27 August 1986) is a British actor, known for his role as teenager Darren Clarke in the long-running BBC school drama, Grange Hill, from 1999 to 2002.

Career
He has also appeared in daytime soap opera Doctors. He provided the voice for Harry Potter in the Order of the Phoenix, Half-Blood Prince and Deathly Hallows – Part 1 and 2 video game adaptations, and for "Rickert of Vinheim" and "Vince of Thorolund" in the video game Dark Souls. He reprised the role of Harry Potter for additional dialogue in the Universal Studios ride Harry Potter and the Escape from Gringotts. In 2014, he played the role of Mick Avory in the musical Sunny Afternoon. In 2016, he returned to the Dark Souls video game series, voicing the male version of "Anri of Astora" in Dark Souls III.

Personal life
After leaving Grange Hill, Adam Sopp trained at the Bristol Old Vic Theatre School.

Filmography

Film

Television

Video games

References

External links
 

1986 births
Living people
Alumni of Bristol Old Vic Theatre School
English male voice actors
English male video game actors
Male actors from Kent